Girolamo Ghinucci (additionally referred to historically as: Jerome de Ghinucci, Geronimo de Ghinucci, Hieronymus Ghinucci, and Girolamo Ginucci; 1480 in Siena – 3 July 1541) was an Italian papal administrator, diplomat and Cardinal in the Roman Catholic Church.

Life
Ghinucci was from a Sienese banking family and became a canon of the cathedral chapter there. He then became secretary to Pope Julius II. He was bishop of Ascoli Piceno from 1512 to 1518. He was an active participant in the Fifth Lateran Council.

Pope Leo X named Ghinucci papal nuncio to England, where Henry VIII retained him for a period as advisor. Ghinucci advised on Henry's moves to divorce Catherine of Aragon. Ghinucci's nephew, Augustine de Augustinis, served as personal physician to Cardinal Wolsey. Augustinis also performed some diplomatic and espionage services for the Cardinal. He later became physician-in-ordinary to Henry VIII.

In 1522, he succeeded Giulio de' Medici, the Cardinal protector of England as Bishop of Worcester (the last of the Italian absentees to hold the see). In September 1525, Bishop Ghinucci was appointed one of Henry's ambassadors in residence in Rome. In November 1526, he was sent on an embassy from Henry to the Holy Roman Emperor in Spain. In October 1529, he was re-accredited to Rome.

He held the bishopric until 1535 when he was deprived of the position by King Henry VIII; also deprived was the Bishop of Salisbury, Lorenzo Campeggio.  In the same year he was made a Cardinal by Pope Paul III, and served on commissions to reform the Church.

He also served as Bishop Administrator of the Diocese of Malta from 1523 to 1538. He was Camerlengo of the Sacred College of Cardinals from January 7, 1538, to January 10, 1539.

He was involved, with Silvester Prierias, in the papal reaction to Martin Luther after 1518.

He maintained English contacts through Richard Croke.

Ghinucci died in Rome July 3, 1541, Rome and was buried in the basilica of San Clemente al Laterano, where he was Cardinal protector from 25 January 1537 until his death. A prominent Latin inscription commemorating him is to be seen in the north aisle of the basilica (to the right of the entrance to the sacristy and excavations).

Notes

External links

Girolamo Ghinucci on catholic-hierarchy.org  

 

 

 

1480 births
1541 deaths
Bishops of Worcester
16th-century English Roman Catholic bishops
People from Ascoli Piceno
Bishops in le Marche
16th-century Italian cardinals
16th-century Italian Roman Catholic bishops
16th-century Italian diplomats
Apostolic Nuncios to Great Britain
Bishops of Malta